Squamous-cell carcinoma (SCC),  also known as epidermoid carcinoma, comprises a number of different types of cancer that begin in squamous cells. These cells form on the surface of the skin, on the lining of hollow organs in the body, and on the lining of the respiratory and digestive tracts.

Common types include:
 esophageal squamous-cell carcinoma: a type of esophageal cancer
 cutaneous squamous-cell carcinoma: a type of skin cancer
 squamous-cell carcinoma of the lung: a type of lung cancer
 squamous-cell carcinoma of the vagina: a type of vaginal cancer
 squamous-cell carcinoma of the thyroid: a type of thyroid cancer

Despite sharing the name "squamous-cell carcinoma", the SCCs of different body sites can show differences in their presented symptoms, natural history, prognosis, and response to treatment.

By body location
Human papillomavirus infection has been associated with SCCs of the oropharynx, lung, fingers, and anogenital region.

Head and neck cancer

About 90% of cases of head and neck cancer (cancer of the mouth, nasal cavity, nasopharynx, throat and associated structures) are due to SCC.

Skin 
Cutaneous squamous-cell carcinoma is the second most common skin cancer, accounting for over 1 million cases in the United States each year.

Thyroid
Primary squamous-cell carcinoma of the thyroid shows an aggressive biological phenotype resulting in poor prognosis for patients.

Esophagus
Esophageal cancer may be due to either esophageal squamous-cell carcinoma (ESCC) or adenocarcinoma (EAC). SCCs tend to occur closer to the mouth, while adenocarcinomas occur closer to the stomach. Dysphagia (difficulty swallowing, solids worse than liquids) and painful swallowing are common initial symptoms. If the disease is localized, surgical removal of the affected esophagus may offer the possibility of a cure. If the disease has spread, chemotherapy and radiotherapy are commonly used.

Lung

When associated with the lung, it is typically a centrally located large-cell cancer (non-small-cell lung cancer). It often has a paraneoplastic syndrome causing ectopic production of parathyroid hormone-related protein, resulting in hypercalcemia, but paraneoplastic syndrome is more commonly associated with small-cell lung cancer. It is primarily due to smoking.

Penis
Human papillomavirus (HPV), primarily HPV 16 and 18, are strongly implicated in the development of SCC of the penis.
Three carcinomas in situ are associated with SCCs of the penis:

 Bowen's disease presents as leukoplakia on the shaft.  Around a third of cases progress to SCC.
 Erythroplasia of Queyrat, a variation of Bowen's disease, presents as erythroplakia on the glans.
 Bowenoid papulosis, which histologically resembles Bowen disease,  presents as reddish papules.

Prostate
When associated with the prostate, squamous-cell carcinoma is very aggressive in nature. It is difficult to detect as no increase in prostate-specific antigen levels is seen, meaning that the cancer is often diagnosed at an advanced stage.

Vagina and cervix
Squamous-cell carcinoma of the vagina spreads slowly and usually stays near the vagina, but may spread to the lungs and liver. This is the most common type of vaginal cancer.

Bladder
Most bladder cancer is transitional cell, but bladder cancer associated with schistosomiasis is often SCC.

Diagnosis

Medical history, physical examination and medical imaging may suggest a squamous-cell carcinoma, but a biopsy for histopathology generally establishes the diagnosis. TP63 staining is the main histological marker for squamous-cell carcinoma. In addition, TP63 is an essential transcription factor to establish identity of the squamous cells.

Classification
Cancer can be considered a very large and exceptionally heterogeneous family of malignant diseases, with squamous-cell carcinomas comprising one of the largest subsets. All SCC lesions are thought to begin via the repeated, uncontrolled division of cancer stem cells of epithelial lineage or characteristics. SCCs arise from squamous cells, which are flat cells that line many areas of the body. Some of which are keratinocytes. Accumulation of these cancer cells causes a microscopic focus of abnormal cells that are, at least initially, locally confined within the specific tissue in which the progenitor cell resided. This condition is called squamous-cell carcinoma in situ, and it is diagnosed when the tumor has not yet penetrated the basement membrane or other delimiting structure to invade adjacent tissues. Once the lesion has grown and progressed to the point where it has breached, penetrated, and infiltrated adjacent structures, it is referred to as "invasive" squamous-cell carcinoma. Once a carcinoma becomes invasive, it is able to spread to other organs and cause the formation of a metastasis, or "secondary tumor".

Tissue of origin
The International Classification of Diseases for Oncology (ICD-O) system lists a number of morphological subtypes and variants of malignant squamous-cell neoplasms, including:
 papillary thyroid carcinoma (code 8050/3)
 verrucous squamous-cell carcinoma (code 8051/3)
 papillary squamous-cell carcinoma (code 8052/3)
 squamous-cell carcinoma (code 8070/3)
 large-cell keratinizing squamous-cell carcinoma (code 8071/3)
 large-cell nonkeratinizing squamous-cell carcinoma (code 8072/3)
 small-cell keratinizing squamous-cell carcinoma (code 8073/3)
 spindle-cell squamous-cell carcinoma (code 8074/3) It is also known as spindle-cell carcinoma, and is a subtype characterized by spindle-shaped atypical cells.
 adenoid/pseudoglandular squamous-cell carcinoma (code 8075/3)
 intraepidermal squamous-cell carcinoma (code 8081/3)
 lymphoepithelial carcinoma (code 8082/3).

Other variants of SCCs are recognized under other systems, such as keratoacanthoma.

Other histopathologic subtypes
 Erythroplasia of Queyrat
 Marjolin's ulcer is a type of SCC that arises from a nonhealing ulcer or burn wound. More recent evidence, however, suggests that genetic differences exist between SCC and Marjolin's ulcer, which were previously underappreciated.
One method of classifying squamous-cell carcinomas is by their appearance under microscope. Subtypes may include:
 adenoid squamous-cell carcinoma (also known as pseudoglandular squamous-cell carcinoma) is characterized by a tubular microscopic pattern and keratinocyte acantholysis.
 basaloid squamous-cell carcinoma is characterized by a predilection for the tongue base.
 clear-cell squamous-cell carcinoma (also known as clear-cell carcinoma of the skin) is characterized by keratinocytes that appear clear as a result of hydropic swelling.
 signet ring-cell squamous-cell carcinoma (occasionally rendered as signet ring-cell squamous-cell carcinoma) is a histological variant characterized by concentric rings composed of keratin and large vacuoles corresponding to markedly dilated endoplasmic reticulum. These vacuoles grow to such an extent that they radically displace the cell nucleus toward the cell membrane, giving the cell a distinctive superficial resemblance to a "signet ring" when viewed under a microscope.

Prevention
Studies have found evidences for an association between diet and skin cancers, including SCC. The consumption of high-fat dairy foods increases SCC tumor risk in people with previous skin cancer. Green leafy vegetables may help prevent development of subsequent SCC and multiple studies found that raw vegetables and fruits are significantly protective against SCC risk. On the other hand, consumption of whole milk, yogurt, and cheese may increase SCC risk in susceptible people. In addition, meat and fat dietary pattern can increase the risk of SCC in people without a history of SCC, but the association is again more prominent in people with a history of skin cancer. Tobacco smoking and a dietary pattern characterized by high beer and liquor intake also increase the risk of SCC significantly.

References

Cancer
Oncology
Epithelium